The Bayer designation Upsilon Cassiopeiae (υ Cas / υ Cassiopeiae) is shared by two star systems, in the constellation Cassiopeia:
 υ¹ Cassiopeiae
 υ² Cassiopeiae
They are separated by 0.3° on the sky.

References

Cassiopeiae, Upsilon
Cassiopeia (constellation)